The City of Kingston has defined 45 distinct neighbourhoods based on census data from Statistics Canada. Different from the city's twelve electoral districts, the neighbourhoods as defined by the City all share common socio-demographic characteristics.. Detailed socio-demographic information on the city can be found in the Kingston Community Profile, 2009: A Socio-Demographic Analysis of Kingston, Ontario Canada. The profile is published by the Social Planning Council of Kingston and District (SPCKD). While some of these neighbourhoods have established their own business improvement area, others are simply a designation given by the City of Kingston in recognition of their distinct attributes and characteristics.

The divisions are arbitrary; they follow census boundaries but often chop existing, recognised neighbourhoods (including the central business district) in two.

Downtown and inner suburbs
These points (and a few others, including Polson Park, Rideau Heights and Alcan), if not part of the original city, were annexed to Kingston from Kingston Township or the former village of Portsmouth no later than the 1950s.

Kingston - West
Most (but not all) of these points were in the former Township of Kingston, annexed on January 1, 1998. The pre-amalgamation boundary is Cataraqui Creek.

Kingston - East
Most of these points were in the former Pittsburgh Township, annexed on January 1, 1998. The pre-amalgamation boundary is the Cataraqui River.

Kingston - North
Many or most of these points (except for those south of the 401) were in the former Township of Kingston, annexed on January 1, 1998.

References